Kevin Adrián Rolón Benítez (born 2 March 2001) is a Uruguayan professional footballer who plays as a midfielder for Montevideo Wanderers.

Career
A youth academy graduate of Montevideo Wanderers, Rolón made his professional debut on 10 February 2021 in a 3–2 league win against Rentistas. He scored his team's second goal in the match, before getting replaced by Lucas Morales.

Rolón is a current Uruguayan youth international.

Career statistics

References

External links
 

2001 births
Living people
Footballers from Montevideo
Association football midfielders
Uruguayan footballers
Uruguayan Primera División players
Montevideo Wanderers F.C. players